Dirk Cloete Jackson (21 April 1885 – 17 September 1976) was a South African rugby union player and cricketer.

Jackson was born on a farm on the outskirts of Cape Town and was educated nearby at Diocesan College. A halfback, he played three of the five international matches on the Springboks' first tour of the British Isles in 1906-07. He was the last survivor of that touring team.

Jackson played first-class cricket for Western Province and Transvaal from 1909 to 1913. He was a member of the Western Province team that won all three matches in the 1908-09 Currie Cup and finished first. He took his best bowling figures during the season: 4 for 36 and 2 for 20 in the innings victory over Eastern Province. He made his highest score of 59 against Orange Free State two years later.

He died at his farm near Pretoria in 1976, aged 91.

References

External links

1885 births
1976 deaths
Alumni of Diocesan College, Cape Town
Cricketers from Cape Town
Rugby union scrum-halves
South African rugby union players
South Africa international rugby union players
South African cricketers
Western Province cricketers
Gauteng cricketers